Primrose is an unincorporated community in Van Zandt County, Texas, United States. According to the Handbook of Texas, the community had a population of 24 in 2000. It is located within the Dallas/Fort Worth Metroplex.

History
J.D. Johnson founded a store here in the early 1900s and named the community Primrose for the primrose flowers growing in the area. A post office was established at Primrose in 1902 and remained in operation until 1910, after which mail was delivered from Ben Wheeler. Primrose had two churches, two businesses, a cemetery, and several scattered houses alongside a population that grew from 10 to 50 in the 1930s. Residents grew fruits, vegetables, and other plants in their gardens. Its population was 20 in 1964 and gained four more residents from 1974 through 2000. From 1967 to 1987, the community only had two churches and one business.

Geography

Education
Primrose had its own school in the 1930s. Since the 1950s, Primrose has been served by the Van Independent School District.

References

Unincorporated communities in Van Zandt County, Texas
Unincorporated communities in Texas